365 may refer to:
 365 (number), an integer
 a common year, consisting of 365 calendar days
 AD 365, a year of the Julian calendar
 365 BC, a year of the 4th century BC

Media outlets 
 365 (media corporation), Icelandic TV company
 365 Media Group, UK sports betting company
 365mag, electronic music e-zine based in Amsterdam

Music 
 365 (album), a 2012 album by Taiwanese Mandopop trio boyband JPM
"365" (Zedd and Katy Perry song)
"365" (Loona song)
 "365", song by Amaranthe
 "365", song by Nicole C. Mullen
 "3.6.5", song by Exo
 K.365, Concerto for 2 pianos & orchestra in E flat major ("Concerto No. 10"), K. 365 (K. 316a) by Wolfgang Amadeus Mozart
 "365", a song by DJ Khaled featuring Kent Jones, Ace Hood and Vado, made for the soundtrack of NBA 2K16
 365, a song by Tiara Andini

Software 
 Microsoft 365, a line of subscription services for office software
 Microsoft Dynamics 365, a product line of enterprise resource planning and customer relationship management
 Windows 365, a cross-platform usage subscriptions to virtualized Windows desktops

See also 
 365 days (disambiguation)